Rúaidhrí Conroy (born 30 November 1979 in Dublin) is an Irish actor. He is the son of actor Brendan Conroy. One of his first castings was as Tito (and not Tayto as commonly misconceived) in the 1992 film  Into the West, for which he won a Young Artist Award in the Outstanding Youth Actors in a Family Foreign Film category.
In 1998, Conroy received the Theatre World Award for his performance in Martin McDonagh's play, The Cripple of Inishmaan.

Conroy also appeared in another McDonagh piece, Six Shooter, which won the Academy Award for Live Action Short Film in 2006. Although invited to the 78th Academy Awards, Conroy was unable to attend due to a "passport infringement" on arrival, resulting in his being returned home.

Filmography

Film

Television

Theatre credits
 1998 – Public Theater, New York production of The Cripple of Inishmaan – Billy (Lead)
 1997 – Royal National Theatre production of The Cripple of Inishmaan – Billy (Lead)
 1999 – Druid Theatre Company (Irish Tour) production of The Country Boy – Lead
 2000 – DRUID Theatre Company at Gaiety Theatre production of The Beauty Queen of Leenane – Ray
 2004 – ART NI production of Philadelphia, Here I Come! – "Public" Gar

Awards
 1993 – Young Artist Award: Outstanding Youth Actors in a Family Foreign Film
 1998 – Theatre World Award

References

External links
 Markham Froggatt Ltd. – Personal management company representing Ruaidhri Conroy.
 
 
 

1979 births
Irish male film actors
Irish male stage actors
Irish male television actors
Living people
Male actors from Dublin (city)
20th-century Irish male actors
21st-century Irish male actors
Theatre World Award winners